Meaning in existentialism is descriptive; therefore it is unlike typical, prescriptive conceptions of "the meaning of life". Due to the methods of existentialism, prescriptive or declarative statements about meaning are unjustified. The root of the word "meaning" is "mean", which is the way someone or something is conveyed, interpreted, or represented. Each individual has his or her own form of unique perspective; meaning is, therefore, purely subjective. Meaning is the way something is understood by an individual; in turn, this subjective meaning is also how the individual may identify it. Meaning is the personal significance of something physical or abstract. This would include the assigning of value(s) to such significance.

Kierkegaard

For Kierkegaard, meaning does not equal knowledge, although both are important. Meaning, for Kierkegaard, is a lived experience, a quest to find one's values, beliefs, and purpose in a meaningless world. As a Christian, Kierkegaard finds his meaning in the Word of God, but for those who are not Christian, Kierkegaard wishes them well in their search.

Sartre

"Existence precedes essence" means that humans exist first before they have meaning in life. Meaning is not given, and must be achieved.
With objects—say, a knife, for example—there is some creator who conceives of an idea or purpose of an object,  and then creates it with the essence of the object already present. The essence of what the knife will be exists before the actual knife itself. Sartre, who was an atheist, believed that if there is no God to have conceived of our essence or nature, then we must come into existence first, and then create our own essence out of interaction with our surroundings and ourselves. With this come serious implications of self-responsibility over who we are and what our lives mean. For this reason, meaning is something without representation or bearing in anything or anyone else. It is something truly unique to each personseparate, independent.

Frankl

Logotherapy is a type of psychological analysis that focuses on a will to meaning as opposed to a Nietzschean/Adlerian doctrine of "will to power" or Freud's "will to pleasure". Frankl also noted the barriers to humanity's quest for meaning in life. He warns against "...affluence, hedonism, [and] materialism..." in the search for meaning.

The following list of tenets represents Frankl's basic principles of Logotherapy:

We can find meaning in life in three different ways:

Logotherapy was developed by psychiatrist and Holocaust survivor Viktor Frankl.

See also
 Man's Search for Meaning – Viktor Frankl's 1946 book
 Meaning (philosophy)

References

Concepts in metaphysics
Existentialist concepts
Meaning (philosophy of language)